The 1921 Ole Miss Rebels football team represented the University of Mississippi during the 1921 college football season. The team was coached by R. L. Sullivan and played in the Bacardi Bowl.

Schedule

References

Ole Miss
Ole Miss Rebels football seasons
Ole Miss Rebels football